Bohdan Viktorovych Bondarenko (born 30 August 1989) is a Ukrainian high jumper. He is the 2013 World champion, 2014 European champion, and 2016 Olympic bronze medalist.

Bondarenko uses the Fosbury Flop technique, jumping off his right leg. He is one of the tallest high jumpers competing on the elite Diamond League circuit, standing 1.98 meters (6' 6"). On 14 June 2014, he achieved his personal best jump of 2.42 metres at the 2014 IAAF Diamond League event in New York City. The jump is a European record and places him joint third on the men's all-time list, behind Javier Sotomayor and Mutaz Essa Barshim and tied with Patrik Sjöberg. His indoor best is 2.27 metres.

Athletics career

Coaching and professional support
Bondarenko is coached by his father Viktor Bondarenko. When Bohdan won the European Athlete of the Year trophy 2013 his father (and thus trainer) received a trainer's award of the European Athletics Association. In a May 2016 interview for the IAAF's official website, Bondarenko said of his father, "I have always understood him and he has always understood me. Many sportsmen cannot be coached by their parents, but for me he has been very good."

Junior competitions and early senior career
In 2005 he had a jump of 2.15 metres, achieved in September in Yalta, and in January 2006 in Kyiv, he improved to 2.21 on the indoor track. In August 2006 he competed at the 2006 World Junior Championships in Beijing. With a jump of 2.14 metres in the qualifying round, he barely managed to reach the final round, where – at age 16 – he was the youngest finalist. Six athletes recorded 2.14 metres, and only two of them reached the final, due to having fewer fouls in the competition. In the final, however, Bondarenko improved greatly to win the bronze medal with a jump of 2.26 metres. The competition was dominated by the duel behind gold medallist Huang Haiqiang and silver medallist Niki Palli. In 2007 he improved his indoor best mark to 2.25 at a meet in Kyiv in February. In the outdoor season, he only managed 2.19 metres.

World Junior Champion Outdoors 2008
In 2008, Bondarenko was eligible for his second World Junior Championships. He had not recorded a notable result during the indoor season, but with a jump of 2.25 metres he qualified for the 2008 World Junior Championships in Bydgoszcz, leading the season's list for juniors. This time, all jumpers with 2.14 in the qualifying round passed on to the final. In the final, Bondarenko cleared every height from 2.08 through 2.26 on the first attempt, except for one miss at 2.21 metres. This was enough to win the gold medal, ahead of Sylwester Bednarek, who placed fourth two years earlier, and Miguel Ángel Sancho. Pre-event favorite Karim Samir Lofty disappointed greatly, ending in last place.

In the 2008–09 indoor season, Bondarenko recorded a new career best as he jumped 2.27 in February in Lódz. Entering the 2009 European Indoor Championships, he managed to equal this height in the qualifying round, which gave him a place in the final. Here, he entered at 2.15, passed 2.20 in his second attempt but failed at 2.25. He ended in ninth and last place.

2012 London Olympics
He set a new personal best of 2.31 on 17 June 2012, jumping in his native Ukraine at Mykolaiv. Bondarenko was a finalist at the 2012 Summer Olympics in London on 7 August 2012, clearing 2.29 and finishing in 7th place. Only 2 men jumped higher, as Bondarenko and five other jumpers ended their competition at 2.29, with the places determined by the countback: there was a 3-way tie for the third place bronze medal (based on clearing 2.29 on their first try), with Bondarenko relegated to seventh because he needed two attempts to clear that height.

2013 outdoor season
Bondarenko seems not to have competed on the indoor circuit during the previous years. His indoor best of 2.27 dated to February 2009 and his outdoor personal best (PB) of 2.31 was set in June 2012. He bested that by jumping 2.33 in his first two Diamond League meets in 2013, beginning with the season's first Diamond League meet at Doha, UAE on 10 May, then again at Shanghai, China, on 18 May. He won 8 of his first 9 competitions. After his win at Doha, Bondarenko told EME News that his victory was unexpected: "I had two pre-season training camps in Yevpatoriya where I injured my take-off (right) knee in the end of April. I was able to make only one technical practice one week before my first performance this season. Moreover in Doha I felt discomfort not only in the knee but also in the feet I had operated in 2009. Pain accompanied me at all attempts (in Doha) but such physical conditions became usual for me during last three years" said 23-year-old Ukrainian.

Bondarenko then set another new PB on Sunday 30 June, winning the Sainsbury's Grand Prix meeting (a Diamond League competition) in Birmingham, England with a jump of 2.36, which tied the meet record and bested Eric Kynard of the USA, who finished second with a jump of 2.34.

Less than a week later, in July 2013, Bondarenko cleared 2.41 metres at another Diamond League meet, the Athletissima, in Lausanne, Switzerland. That was the highest jump in the world since 1994. By clearing 2.41, Bondarenko also broke the Ukrainian national record of 2.40, set by Rudolf Povarnitsyn in 1985 (which was then a new world record.) Bondarenko was pushed to 2.41 by American Eric Kynard. They were the only jumpers remaining after 2.33 and engaged in a "passing" duel- Kynard took the lead with a first attempt clearance of 2.33, Bondarenko passed, but then cleared 2.35 on his first attempt. Kynard missed at 2.35, then passed to 2.37, clearing on his first attempt to retake the lead as Bondarenko passed. When Bondarenko then cleared 2.39 on his first try, Kynard missed and then used his two remaining attempts at 2.41 (unsuccessfully.) Bondarenko cleared 2.41 (7 feet, 11 inches) on his third try (only his 7th jump of the competition): video of his 2.41 clearance shows him taking off nearly 4 feet away from the bar and clearing it cleanly (if only barely). He then made three excellent attempts at a new world record of 2.46—on each of his three attempts he succeeded in getting his head, shoulders and back over the bar, but not his hips.

On Friday 26 July, competing in yet another Diamond League meet – the Anniversary Games in London's 2012 Olympic Stadium – Bondarenko again bested Eric Kynard, winning with a jump of 2.38 (7' 9-3/4") to Kynard's 2.36. Bondarenko did not even begin jumping until 2.28 (7' 5-3/4"), the highest "opening" height ever in a Diamond League event. He secured the win after just his third jump and then had the bar raised to 2.43 (7' 11 1/2") – one centimeter above the European record set by Sweden's Patrik Sjöberg in 1987. He made one excellent attempt and despite knocking the bar off, he felt confident enough to have the bar raised for a world record attempt of 2.47 (8 feet, one and one-quarter inch), threatening the 20-year world record of 2.45 held by Cuba's Javier Sotomayor. Although his two attempts at 2.47 failed, the experience was rewarding.

2013 Moscow World Championship
In August, Bondarenko competed at the 2013 World Championships in Moscow, Russia. With three athletes (the other two being Derek Drouin and Mutaz Essa Barshim) still jumping at 2.41m, Bondarenko was the only one to clear that mark, thus equalling his personal best and world leading jump and breaking Javier Sotomayor's Championship record. He needed to in order to win the competition, since he had passed 2.38, a height cleared by both his opponents. Drouin failed his 3 attempts at 2.41, while Barshim, after his first attempt, saved the remaining two for the following height of 2.44 (which Bondarenko had passed), but couldn't get it, settling for silver. With the gold medal around his neck, Bondarenko had another go at the world record, once again unsuccessfully.

Bondarenko was awarded the 2013 European Athlete of the Year trophy.

2014
Early in the season, Ivan Ukhov and then Mutaz Essa Barshim equalled Bondarenko's 2.41m making for the trio of contemporary athletes having cleared the third highest height in history.

May 11, Tokyo (1st, 2.40m). Bondarenko won the Diamond League meeting in Tokyo with a jump of 2.40m (7 ft-10.5in) in Tokyo on Sunday, beating the Olympic Champion Ivan Ukhov, who could manage "only" 2.34m (just two days after he cleared 2.41m to win in Doha on 9 May.)

June 5, Rome (2nd, 2.34m). All of the top high jumpers were entered in the "Golden Gala" Diamond League meet in Rome. After clearing 2.34m, Bondarenko elected to pass attempts at 2.37 and 2.41, the later which was cleared by Mutaz Essa Barshim. Bondarenko then had three close attempts at what would have been a European record of 2.43m.

June 8, Marrakesh (1st, 2.39m). Competing at the 7th Mohammed VI d’Athletisme IAAF World Challenge meeting in Marrakesh, Morocco on 8 June, Bondarenko won the meet when cleared 2.39m on his second try – just his fourth leap of the entire competition, having made first try jumps at 2.25m and 2.33m. The 2.39m is an African "All Comers" record, the highest jump ever on the African continent. Bondarenko then had the bar raised to world record height of 2.46m and made three unsuccessful attempts. Traditionally held in Rabat, this year the Mohammed VI d’Athletisme meeting was moved to the Grand Stade de Marrakech.

June 14, New York City (1st, 2.42m). The following week at the Adidas Grand Prix, Icahn Stadium, New York City, on Saturday afternoon June 14, Bondarenko and Barshim were locked in a tight competition, with both improving to 2.42m (on their first attempts), equalling Patrick Sjoberg's former world record from 1987 as the second best jumpers outdoors in history. [Ukhov and Carlo Thränhardt (1988) have also jumped that height under more controlled conditions indoors.] Still in competition, Bondarenko—whose clearance of 2.42m was just his fifth jump of the day—then passed while Barshim took one failed attempt at 2.44m. Saving his strength, Bondarenko took all three of his attempts at a world record height of 2.46, while Barshim took his remaining two attempts at 2.46m to try to beat Javier Sotomayor's world record of 2.45m that has stood since 1993. Almost incidental, Bondarenko won the competition on fewer misses. (Barshim clearing of 2.42 and attempt on 2.46 were much better than Bodarenko's.) Bondarenko now joins Sjoberg in possession of the European record. The 2.42m mark (7 feet 11 & one-quarter inch) is also the United States "Open" record - the highest jumps ever made in North America.

In August, Bondarenko took gold at the 2014 European Championships in Zurich.

2015 to present 

At the 2015 World Championships in Beijing, Bondarenko tied for silver with China's Zhang Guowei, behind Canada's Derek Drouin. He won the bronze medal at the 2016 Summer Olympics in Rio de Janeiro.

Competition record

International competitions

Awards
European Athlete of the Year 2013
Track & Field Athlete of the Year 2013

See also
 High jump all-time lists

References

External links

 
 
 
 

1989 births
Living people
Ukrainian male high jumpers
Sportspeople from Kharkiv
Athletes (track and field) at the 2012 Summer Olympics
Athletes (track and field) at the 2016 Summer Olympics
Olympic athletes of Ukraine
European champions for Ukraine
World Athletics Championships athletes for Ukraine
European Athletics Championships medalists
World Athletics Championships medalists
Olympic bronze medalists for Ukraine
Medalists at the 2016 Summer Olympics
Olympic bronze medalists in athletics (track and field)
Universiade medalists in athletics (track and field)
European Athlete of the Year winners
Track & Field News Athlete of the Year winners
Universiade gold medalists for Ukraine
Athletes (track and field) at the 2019 European Games
European Games medalists in athletics
European Games bronze medalists for Ukraine
European Games gold medalists for Ukraine
Diamond League winners
IAAF Continental Cup winners
World Athletics Championships winners
Medalists at the 2011 Summer Universiade